DreamWorks Tours: Shrek's Adventure!, commonly referred to as Shrek's Adventure!, is a Midway attraction operated by Merlin Entertainments. The tour is named after DreamWorks Animation franchise Shrek. This "Immersive Tunnel" from Simworx is built in collaboration with Merlin Entertainments, the  live interactive walk-through adventure presents an original story written by DWA, along with a character courtyard, also featuring characters from several other DreamWorks Animation's franchises.

References

Merlin Entertainments Group
Shrek (franchise)
2015 establishments in England
Tourist attractions in the London Borough of Lambeth